The Infamous Lady is a 1928 British silent drama film directed by Geoffrey Barkas and Michael Barringer and starring Arthur Wontner, Ruby Miller and Walter Tennyson. It was made at Twickenham Studios. It is also known by the alternative title Mayfair.

Cast
 Arthur Wontner as The King's Counsel
 Ruby Miller as The Adventuress 
 Walter Tennyson as The Man 
 Muriel Angelus as The Girl 
 John Rowal as The Tramp 
 Dora Barton as The Wife 
 Ion Swinley as The Explorer

References

Bibliography
 Low, Rachel. The History of British Film: Volume IV, 1918–1929. Routledge, 1997.

External links

1928 films
British drama films
British silent feature films
1928 drama films
Films shot at Twickenham Film Studios
British black-and-white films
Films directed by Geoffrey Barkas
1920s English-language films
1920s British films
Silent drama films